Ultraman: Towards the Future, released in Japan as , is a Japanese–Australian tokusatsu science fiction television series produced as a co-production between Tsuburaya Productions and the South Australian Film Corporation. It is the 10th installment in the Ultra Series, the first series to be produced during Japan's Heisei period and the third foreign production in the franchise after Ultraman: The Adventure Begins.

Despite being co-produced by an Australian studio and filmed in Australia, the series never aired in Australia, and instead was released direct to video and LaserDisc in Japan on September 25, 1990. The series aired in the United States in 1992, and in Japan in 1995.

Premise
Jack Shindo and Stanley Haggard are members of the first crewed expedition to Mars, and on the red planet find a giant sluglike monster, Gudis. Suddenly the alien giant, Ultraman Great, arrives and fights Gudis, but is knocked down for a period. Shindo is pinned by a rockslide and Haggard tries to escape in their ship, but it is blown up by Gudis. It is then that Ultraman Great gets up and when he is on the verge of victory, Gudis metamorphoses into a virus and travels to Earth, where it plans on corrupting all life, mutating other creatures into monsters and awakening existing ones. Needing a human host to survive on Earth, Ultraman Great joins with Jack, allowing him to become the colossal alien when all seems lost. He joins the Universal Multipurpose Agency, or UMA, in order to help them battle the monsters.

Halfway through the series Super Gudis reappears, more powerful than before. It imprisons Ultraman Great, but Jack distracts it by ultimately showing it the futility of its mission. Even if it does manage to corrupt all life, eventually there will be nothing else left to corrupt. The distraction allows Ultraman Great to break free and destroy Super Gudis once and for all. For the rest of the series, the environmental themes are stronger and the monsters usually arise from human pollution.

In the series finale, a doomsday scenario begins with the appearance of two powerful monsters, Kilazee and Kodalar, both of which try to wipe out the human race for abusing it. Ultraman Great is defeated by Kodalar, but Jack survives. Ultimately the humans use an ancient disc to destroy Kodalar by reflecting its own power at it, Ultraman Great defeats Kilazee and carries it into space, separating Jack from him and restoring him on Earth as a normal human. The victory is seen as another chance for the human race.

Cast

 Dore Kraus as Jack Shindo/Ultraman Great
 Ralph Cotterill as Captain Arthur Grant
 Lloyd Morris as Charles Morgan
 Gia Carides as Jean Echo
 Rick Adams III as Lloyd Wilder
 Grace Parr as Kim Shaomin
 David Grybowski as Ike
 Jay Hackett as Stanley Haggard
 Peter Raymond Powell as Lieutenant Brewster
 John Bonney as Narrator
 Matthew O'Sullivan as Ultraman Great (voice)
 Steve Apps as Ultraman Great
 Robert Simper as Ultraman Great
 Michael Read as The Monsters
 Johnny Hallyday as The Monsters

Episode list

Production
Principal photography lasted for four months. Terry Larsen provided the environmental and ecological themes for the show. Unlike previous installments, spandex was used for Ultraman instead of a rubber suit. Director Andrew Prowse stated that the decision to employ spandex instead of the traditional rubber suit was made so that the "actor could move in it" and "reduce the risk of heat exhaustion" however, the suit actor passed out one day in the spandex suit. Steve Apps and Robert Simper performed the Ultraman suitmation sequences. Vicky Kite constructed the suits while Andrew Blaxland oversaw the production design.

Merchandising

Soundtrack

The music was composed by Shinsuke Kazato and performed by The Adelaide Symphony Orchestra. Most of the melodies and motifs are based on very similar music used in the 1987 anime Ultraman USA (a.k.a. Ultraman: The Adventure Begins), which was also scored by Shinsuke Kazato.

The Ultraman G soundtrack was first released by Nippon Columbia Co., Ltd in 1992 as stock number COCC-9745. It was re-released in 2007 as part of Nippon Columbia's "ANIMEX2000" series of inexpensive album reissues, under stock number COCC-72238. As of 2016, this version is still available for order from Japanese record stores.

Toy line
The series also received an equally short-lived toyline from DreamWorks toys. The figures were 10" tall and included Ultraman, who came with a mini Jack Shindo, as well as his enemies Bogun, Barrangas, Majaba, Gerukadon and Kilazee. Also released was a toy of the Hummer vehicle which included a mini figure of Charlie Morgan. A toy of the Saltop was advertised on the back of all boxes, though it was never released or produced according to a Bandai representative. Despite their unique size, the toys were not without their problems. Jack, Charlie and the Hummer were well out of scale with the other toys, while the Ultraman figure lacked articulation. Also, despite being the main villain for the first story arc, neither version of Gudis was released as a toy in the DreamWorks line (although one did appear in Bandai's Japanese vinyl Ultraman line).

Video game

A video game based on the series was released for Super Nintendo Entertainment System/Super Famicom. It is thought to have awkward controls and an unfairly high level of difficulty by many. It was based around the same engine as a Japanese Ultraman game based on the original series. In the game Ultraman fights Gudis, Bogun, Deganja, Barrangas, Super Gudis, Gazebo, Majaba, Kodalar, and Kilazee.

Comic book
A comic book retelling of/sequel to the series, published in early 1993 by Harvey Comics' short-lived "Nemesis" label, was printed in the United States. However, the comic treats Ultraman Great as the same Ultraman from the original 1966 series. The comic has also been known to confuse Ultraman: Towards the Future with the subsequent American-produced series, Ultraman: The Ultimate Hero (which was released as Ultraman Powered in Japan), of which the comic had included plenty of full-color publicity pictures in many issues to generate interest. After four issues (five if the "Minus-1" issue is included), the comic series was cancelled once Harvey Comics went out of business the next year. Most of the issues had different collectible cover variants.

Media

Other appearances
 Ultraman vs. Kamen Rider: This movie used Great's stock footage in the original series.
 Mega Monster Battle: Ultra Galaxy: Ultraman Great, along with other M78 Ultra Warriors, fights against the evil Ultraman Belial. However, this series does not reference other Ultramen that came to Earth and Great is not a member of the "Ultra Brothers".
 Ultra Galaxy Fight: The Absolute Conspiracy: Great is set to appear alongside fellow internationally-produced Ultraman, Ultraman Powered, in this 2020 YouTube miniseries.

International broadcast
In Thailand, this series aired on Channel 9 (is currently Channel 9 MCOT HD) in 1993 on Saturdays and Sundays late in the day. Sachs Family Entertainment distributed the show for American television via weekly syndication between 4 January 1992 and 28 March 1992.

References

Bibliography

External links

 Ultraman G (Great) Blu-ray Box - Tsuburaya Production Promotion Page
 Ultraman G (Video 1)
 Ultraman G (Video 2)

 Ultraman G Gudis' counterattack - allcinema

 Ultraman G Monster Fighting Operation - allcinema

Australian action television series
Australian fantasy television series
Australian science fiction television series
Australian television series based on Japanese television series
Japanese action television series
Japanese fantasy television series
Japanese science fiction television series
Ultra television series
1992 Australian television series debuts
1992 Australian television series endings
1992 Japanese television series debuts
1992 Japanese television series endings